Stadion Hristo Botev is a multi-purpose stadium in Vratsa, Bulgaria.  It is currently used mostly for football matches. It has been the home of Botev Vratsa for 60 years. The stadium was built in 1948 and has a seating capacity of 6,417 spectators. After the approval of a project worth € 150 000, in 2008 the stadium was renovated and had 2,255 seats, spread in the 3 central sectors. In June 2009, the Botev Vratsa management approved a second project, worth € 120 000 for reconstruction of sector "V", opposite the central building of the stadium. The second renovation was completed in 2009.

As of 2009, the stadium has 4,455 plastic seats. In October 2009, the stadium received a license from the Bulgarian Football Union to host games from all divisions of Bulgarian football.

In 2013, the Municipality of Vratsa is planning to continue renovation by re-building the two side sectors, which will increase the seating capacity to 6,417 spectators.

References

Football venues in Bulgaria
Vratsa
Multi-purpose stadiums in Bulgaria
Buildings and structures in Vratsa Province